I Mundialito de Seniors (also known as I Copa Pelé) was the first World Cup of Masters. This was an unsanctioned tournament, and players were not recognised with international caps. It was held in January 1987 in Brazil. There were five countries that originally entered – Brazil, Argentina, Uruguay, West Germany and Italy.

The tournament pitted all teams against each other in a League, with the top two teams then playing each other in the final. Argentina won the event, beating Brazil 1-0 in the final in São Paulo. The final between Argentina and Brazil drew 50,000 fans reviving moments of glory for the bitter rivals.

Venues
Three cities hosted the tournament:

Squads
For the list of the squads, see 1987 Copa Pelé squads.

Results

Group table

Final

Match details

Goal scorers

2 goals
  Rivelino
  Oscar Más
  Darío Felman

Champion

References

World Cup of Masters events
1987
1987 in Brazilian football
1987 in Uruguayan football
1986–87 in Argentine football
1986–87 in German football
1986–87 in Italian football